Nahshon Wright  (born September 23, 1998) is an American football cornerback for the Dallas Cowboys of the National Football League (NFL). He played college football at Oregon State.

Early years
Wright attended James Logan High School, where he played as a wide receiver and cornerback. He also lettered in basketball and track. He enrolled at Laney College, where he contributed to the team winning the 2018 state championship. He tallied 12 starts, 17 tackles (1.5 for loss), four interceptions, and three passes defensed, while earning All-conference honors.

He transferred to Oregon State University in 2019. As a sophomore, he appeared in all 12 games with 10 starts, posting 34 tackles (half a tackle for loss) and three interceptions.

As a junior in 2020, the football season was reduced to seven games due to the COVID-19 pandemic. He started in six games, registering 30 tackles, two interceptions, four passes defensed, and one sack. He had six tackles and one interception against California. He had seven tackles, one interception, and one pass defensed against Oregon. He had seven tackles and one sack against Stanford. He declared for the NFL Draft after the season.

Professional career

Wright was selected by the Dallas Cowboys in the third round (99th overall) of the 2021 NFL Draft. The selection was criticized in the media as a reach, while the team passed on other defensive backs like Elijah Molden, Ifeatu Melifonwu, Ambry Thomas and Brandon Stephens. Wright signed his four-year rookie contract with Dallas on July 21, worth $4.8 million. In Week 9 against the Denver Broncos, he touched a blocked punt after it passed the line of scrimmage, causing the officiating crew to award the ball back to the Broncos with a new set of downs. In Week 10 against the Atlanta Falcons, he recovered a blocked punt for a touchdown. He played mainly on special teams, finishing the season with seven defensive tackles and two special-teams tackles.

Personal life
His younger brother Rezjohn was featured in the 2020 season of the series Last Chance U.

References

External links
 Oregon State bio

1998 births
Living people
Dallas Cowboys players
Laney Eagles football players
Oregon State Beavers football players
People from East Palo Alto, California
People from Hayward, California
Sportspeople from Alameda County, California
Players of American football from California
American football cornerbacks